St. Pachomious Monastery is a women's monastic community located on Route 1 in Greenfield, Missouri, US. The monastery, named after Pachomius the Serb, is part of the Serbian Orthodox Church in North and South America and under the omophorion of Bishop Longin (Krčo) of the Serbian Orthodox Eparchy of New Gračanica and Midwestern America. The sisters within the community derive their income from donations, prayer ropes, and church candles. The monastery has a guest house dedicated to hospitality and a chapel open to guests.

St. Pachomious Monastery is one of 80 American Orthodox monasteries.

See also
 St. Sava Serbian Orthodox Monastery, located at the Episcopal headquarters of the Serbian Orthodox Eparchy of Eastern America, Libertyville, Illinois
 New Gračanica Monastery, located at the Episcopal headquarters of the Serbian Orthodox Eparchy of New Gračanica and Midwestern America, Third Lake, Illinois
 Episcopal headquarters of the Serbian Orthodox Eparchy of Western America, located at Saint Steven's Serbian Orthodox Cathedral, Alhambra, California
 Holy Transfiguration Serbian Orthodox Monastery, Milton, Ontario, Canada
 Episcopal headquarters of the Serbian Orthodox Eparchy of Buenos Aires and South America, Buenos Aires, Argentina
 Monastery of St. Paisius, Safford
 St. Xenia Serbian Orthodox Skete
 St. Archangel Michael Skete
 St. Nilus Island Skete
 Saint Herman of Alaska Monastery
 St. Mark Serbian Orthodox Monastery

References 

Serbian Orthodox Church in the United States
Religion in Missouri
Serbian Orthodox monasteries in the United States